Calothamnus quadrifidus subsp. angustifolia is a plant in the myrtle family, Myrtaceae and is endemic to the south-west of Western Australia.  It is similar to other subspecies of Calothamnus quadrifidus except that it has longer leaves than most although in some areas there are plants that are intermediate with Calothamnus quadrifolius subsp. obtusus.  The leaves are flat, narrow and prickly.

Description

The flowers are red and are arranged in clusters, usually on one side of the stem amongst the older leaves.

Taxonomy and naming
Calothamnus quadrifidus subsp. angustifolia was first formally described in 2010 by Alex George in Nuytsia from a specimen collected near central Greenough. It had originally been described in 1911 by Alfred James Ewart as Calothamnus homalophyllus var. angustifolius. The epithet angustifolius is derived from the Latin words angustus meaning "narrow, tight, slender or thin" and folium meaning "leaf".

Distribution and habitat
Calothamnus quadrifidus subsp. angustifolius is found inland from Busselton in the Avon Wheatbelt, Geraldton Sandplains, Mallee and Swan Coastal Plain biogeographic regions. It grows in clay near ironstone in shrubland that is wet in winter.

Conservation
Calothamnus quadrifidus subsp. angustifolius is classified as "not threatened" by the Western Australian government department of parks and wildlife.

References

quadrifidus
Myrtales of Australia
Plants described in 2010
Plant subspecies